T. similis  may refer to:
 Tabanus similis, a biting horsefly species in the genus Tabanus
 Tarachodes similis, a praying mantis species
 Trialeurodes similis, a whitefly species
 Trichopsomyia similis, a hoverfly species in the genus Trichopsomyia
 Troglohyphantes similis, the Kočevje subterranean spider, a spider species endemic to Slovenia
 Tutelina similis, a jumping spider species in the genus Tutelina

See also